Trent Clayton (born 24 May 1981) is a former French international rugby league footballer. He played for Toulouse Olympique in the Elite One Championship. He had previously played for the Sydney Roosters, Wests Tigers and Penrith Panthers in the National Rugby League.

Background
Clayton was born in North Sydney, New South Wales, Australia.

Playing career
Clayton played for the Redcliffe Dolphins in the 1998 Queensland Cup.

Clayton was originally named in the France training squad for the 2008 Rugby League World Cup but was removed after failing eligibility criteria.

In 2009, Clayton returned to Australia to play for Redcliffe Dolphins in the Queensland Cup.

References

External links
Redcliffe Dolphins profile
Rinaldi to Captain France

1981 births
Living people
Australian rugby league players
Penrith Panthers players
Sydney Roosters players
Toulouse Olympique players
Redcliffe Dolphins players
Rugby league wingers
France national rugby league team players
Rugby league players from Sydney
Wests Tigers players